Tavernier is a census-designated place (CDP) and unincorporated community in Monroe County, Florida, United States on Key Largo, the largest island in the upper Florida Keys. Tavernier's population was 2,530 at the 2020 census, up from 2,136 in 2010.

Geography
Tavernier is located at  (25.015156, -80.513678). It occupies the southwesternmost  of Key Largo, the largest of the Florida Keys. Tavernier is bordered to the northeast by the community of Key Largo and to the southwest, across Tavernier Creek, by the village of Islamorada on Plantation Key.

U.S. Route 1 (the Overseas Highway) runs through Tavernier, leading southwest  to Key West and northeast  to Miami.

Climate
Tavernier has a tropical savanna climate (Aw), according to the Köppen climate classification.

Demographics

2020 census

As of the 2020 United States census,  2,530 people, 768 households, and 462 families were residing in the CDP.

2000 census
In the 2000 census, 2,173 people resided in the CDP, making up 938 households, and 602 families.  The population density was 321.5/km (832.1/mi2). The 1,806 housing units had an average density of 267.2/km (691.6/mi2). The racial makeup of the CDP was 96.78% White, 0.83% African American, 0.46% Native American, 0.32% Asian, 0.05% Pacific Islander, 0.78% from other races, and 0.78% from two or more races. Hispanics or Latinos of any race were 19.51% of the population. 

Of the 938 households, 26.3% had children under 18 living with them, 50.6% were married couples living together, 8.1% had a female householder with no husband present, and 35.8% were not families. About 26.1% of all households were made up of individuals, and 7.8% had someone living alone who was 65 or older. The average household size was 2.29, and the average family size was 2.74.

In the CDP, 20.4% of the population was under 18, 4.8% were from 18 to 24, 28.3% were from 25 to 44, 31.0% were from 45 to 64, and 15.5% were 65 or older. The median age was 43 years. For every 100 females, there were 103.5 males. For every 100 females 18 and over, there were 102.8 males.

The median income for a household in the CDP was $40,881, and for a family was $46,141. Males had a median income of $30,221 versus $26,397 for females. The per capita income for the CDP was $22,592.  About 7.3% of families and 9.9% of the population were below the poverty line, including 15.6% of those under age 18 and 8.5% of those age 65 or over.

Education
Monroe County School District operates public schools.

Residents are zoned to Plantation Key School on Plantation Key.

Coral Shores High School is in Islamorada and it has a Tavernier address.

Notable people
William O'Brien, 21st police chief of Miami

References

External links

 History of Tavernier
 History of Key Largo

Census-designated places in Florida
Census-designated places in Monroe County, Florida
Key Largo
Unincorporated communities in Monroe County, Florida
Unincorporated communities in Florida
Populated coastal places in Florida on the Atlantic Ocean